Ravi Chaturvedi is an Indian sports commentator and author of twenty seven books on cricket, including World Cup Cricket: A Compendium, known to be first Indian sports commentator in Hindi. He was honored by the Government of India, in 2012, with the fourth highest Indian civilian award of Padma Shri.. Matu Shri and Khel Samrat awards for best Hindi commentator and as educationist offered membership by India International Intellectual Society. He has been on Board of Directors, Delhi District Cricket Association (DDCA), member, Bombay Natural History Society and on the advisory committee of The National Zoology Park.

Autobiography
Ravi Chaturvedi hails from Delhi. With high academic profile, M.Sc. in Zoology (specialization in Fisheries) Delhi University; Diploma in Microbiology (Virology, Institute of Microbiology), Czechoslovak Academy of Sciences; Tissue Culture training, University of Windsor, Canada; and Ph.D. in Cricket (Physical Education) CSJM University, Kanpur. He is a former faculty member of Zoology for forty years at Zakir Husain Delhi College, University of Delhi.(

In 1960, Government of India decided to have Hindi coverage of all major sporting events and Ravi Chaturvedi made his debut as first Hindi commentator of All India Radio in 1961. Over the years, he has covered 112 Tests and 220 ODIs, apart from other sporting events.() He has also been associated with Star Sports, ESPN, TWI, Nimbus Sports, World Tel. New Zealand TV, Doordarshan, Sab TV, Caribbean Broadcasting Corporation, Guardian Radio, Trinidad TV, Radio 360, BBC, Voice of America (VOA) and All India Radio(13). He has assisted UNESCO and World Wide Fund (WWF) for Nature in an international project Naming of Cricketing Countries based on their Endangered Animal for Fostering Peace, International Understanding and Promoting Environmental Protection.

As a freelance journalist besides cricket, he writes on culture, education, environment protection, wildlife conservation and even politics periodically. He has contributed regularly in all major national dailies both in English and Hindi, major sports weeklies of the country and in Australia, England (Wisden) and West-Indies. Through Cricket he has developed abiding interest in the Caribbean Cricket and the Indian Diaspora. He is a regular cricket columnist and even acts as an expert on Trinity Mirror TV and writes on other facets of social activities of the country in a Chennai based daily Trinity Mirror. A man with mission, during his stints with Fisheries Department., made Fish Farm, as a Zoology teacher, built a unique Zoology Museum as a commentator established Hindi cricket commentary and provided it credibility and popularity.

Through his writings in Wisden he has promoted cricket in Bhutan, Hawaii, Kuwait, Maldives, Malaysia and Singapore. His involvement in various organizations saw him on international platforms; World Assembly of Youth’s (WAY) Annual Conference, Liege, Belgium (1969), WAY Asia-Pacific Population Education Seminar, Singapore (1970) and involvement in Caribbean Indian Diaspora paved way to his being a member of Indian Cultural delegations to Guyana (1988) and Trinidad & Tobago (1995) in connection with celebrations for 150th anniversary of Indian Arrival.  

Chaturvedi has retained umbilical relationship with his ancestral village Dalip Nagar, Kanpur, Uttar Pradesh by getting electricity installed, got local roads pucca that connect to the highway , helped get desilted blocked irrigation canal  and repaired for free flow of water for farmers for irrigation purposes.

Chaturvedi has authored twenty seven books on cricket; seventeen in English, five in Hindi and one in Marathi.(15)(16).  Some of his notable works are:

·        World Cup Cricket: A Compendium

·        Millennium's Greatest Indian Cricketers

·        Cricket Ke Sitare (The Stars of Cricket)

·        The Complete Book of West Indies-India Test Cricket

·        Legendary Indian Cricketers (Men, Moments and Memories)

·        Cricket Ki Rochak Baten (Cricket - Interesting Facts)

·        World Cup Cricket

·        Cricket Commentary Kaksh Se (Hindi )

·        Cricket in Indian Mythology (Sports in Indian context)

·        Cricket commentary and commentators

·        Cricket Pauranic Sandarbh (Khel Bhartiya Pakch) (Hindi)

He has also contributed to the book, Sojourners to Settlers, writing on the topic, Contribution of the Indo-West Indians to Caribbean Cricket. He writes editorials and columns for Hindustan Times, an English-language daily from India. He is known to have friendly ties with renowned deceased and living Test cricketers; Mushtaq Ali, Polly Umrigar, Nawab Pataudi, Ajit Wadekar, Chandu Bord, Bapu Nadkarni, Farokh Engineer, Bishan Singh Bedi,  Gundappa Vishwanath, Sunil Gavaskar, Srnivas Venkataraghavan, Mohinder Amarnath, Dilip Vengsarkar,  Ravi Shahtri, Mohammad Azharuddin, Sachin Tendulkar, Manoj Prabhakar, Maninder Singh, Virender  Sehwag; Bobby Simpson, Raman Subba Row, Mushtaq Mohammad, Glenn Turner, Jeff  Stollmeyer, Sir Gary Sobers, Sir Wesley  Hall, Clive Lloyd, Deryck Murray, Alvin Kallicharran, Sir Viv Richards, Sir Richie Richardson, Daren Ganga and  Ranjan Madugalle.   

Chaturvedi is Widely travelled: countries visited; Australia, Belgium, Bhutan, Barbados, Cambodia, Canada, China, Czech Republic, England, France,   Germany, Guyana, Hong Kong,  Indonesia, Iraq, Jamaica, Jordan, Kuwait, Lebanon, Malaysia, Mauritius, New Zealand, Netherlands, Pakistan, Romania, Singapore,  Slovak Republic, South Africa, Surinam,  Syria,  Thailand, Trinidad & Tobago, UAE (Dubai, Sharjah) and USA.

See also
 Cricket in India
 Cricket World Cup
Journalist
Sports commentator
Mayanti Langer
Kanthi D. Suresh

References

Further reading

External links
 

Living people
Recipients of the Padma Shri in sports
Writers from Delhi
Indian cricket commentators
Indian male journalists
Indian sports journalists
Cricket historians and writers
20th-century Indian historians
20th-century Indian non-fiction writers
1937 births